Solenocarpus is a genus of flowering plants belonging to the family Anacardiaceae.

Its native range is Southern India, Malesia to New Guinea.

Species:

Solenocarpus indicus 
Solenocarpus philippinensis

References

Anacardiaceae
Anacardiaceae genera